Jub Khaleh or Jubkhaleh, also known as Chuy Qaleh or Jukheleh or Juy Khaleh, may refer to:
 Jub Khaleh-ye Olya
 Jub Khaleh-ye Sofla